Chelonian has multiple, interrelated meanings:

 Chelonia, the order uniting all turtles
 Genus of sea turtle of which the green sea turtle is the only extant member
 The Chelonians, an alien race of humanoid tortoises that appear in the Doctor Who science fiction TV series - see List of Doctor Who universe creatures and aliens#Chelonian
 Chelonian Conservation and Biology, International Journal of Turtle and Tortoise Research

See also 
 Cheloniology, the study of turtles.